Reginald Kristen McClain (born November 16, 1992) is an American professional baseball pitcher who is currently a free agent. He has previously played in Major League Baseball (MLB) for the Seattle Mariners and Philadelphia Phillies.

Amateur career
McClain attended Northview High School in Johns Creek, Georgia. McClain attended the University of Georgia his freshman season, but was redshirted and did not play for them. He transferred to State College of Florida, Manatee–Sarasota, where he played college baseball for two seasons. He transferred to the University of Missouri, and played two seasons for the Tigers.

Professional career

Minor leagues 
The Seattle Mariners selected McClain in the 13th round, with the 387th overall selection, of the 2016 MLB draft. McClain played for the Everett AquaSox in 2016, pitching to a 3–3 win–loss record with a 4.47 earned run average (ERA) in 48 innings pitched. He spent the 2017 season with the Modesto Nuts, going 12–9 with a 4.75 ERA in 153 innings. He returned to Modesto for the 2018 season, going 6–11 with a 5.01 ERA in 133 innings. In the 2019 season, McClain has split time between Modesto, the Arkansas Travelers, and the Tacoma Rainiers.

Seattle Mariners 
On August 2, 2019, the Mariners selected McClain's contract and promoted him to the major leagues. He made his major league debut that night versus the Houston Astros, recording two strikeouts while allowing three runs in one inning of relief. He pitched to a 1–1 record and a 6.00 ERA in 21 innings pitched for Seattle. McClain was designated for assignment by the Mariners on January 24, 2020.

Philadelphia Phillies
On January 31, 2020, McClain was claimed off waivers by the Philadelphia Phillies. McClain was designated for assignment by the Phillies on August 31, 2020. At the time of his designation, McClain had pitched in five games for the Phillies in 2020, pitching to a 5.06 ERA over  innings. He was outrighted on September 3.

New York Yankees
On December 10, 2020, the New York Yankees selected McClain from the Phillies in the minor league phase of the 2020 Rule 5 draft. The Yankees invited McClain to spring training as a non-roster player. The Yankees assigned him to the Scranton/Wilkes-Barre RailRiders. On July 21, McClain combined with Luis Gil and Stephen Ridings to throw a no-hitter. He elected free agency on November 10, 2022.

See also
Rule 5 draft results

References

External links

Missouri Tigers bio

1992 births
Living people
African-American baseball players
People from Duluth, Georgia
Baseball players from Georgia (U.S. state)
Major League Baseball pitchers
Seattle Mariners players
Philadelphia Phillies players
SCF Manatees baseball players
Missouri Tigers baseball players
Everett AquaSox players
Modesto Nuts players
Arkansas Travelers players
Tacoma Rainiers players
Scranton/Wilkes-Barre RailRiders players
State College of Florida, Manatee–Sarasota alumni
Sportspeople from the Atlanta metropolitan area
21st-century African-American sportspeople